Bertha Patricia Sánchez Gallegos (born 1958) is a politician of Ecuador. She is a member of the National Assembly of Ecuador for the Pachakutik Plurinational Unity Movement – New Country party.

Life
Sánchez was born in Cuenca in 1958. She studied in several countries at the Pontifical Catholic University of Chile, the Latin American School for Social Sciences and Central University of Venezuela.

She learned that she was elected to the National Assembly of Ecuador for the Pachakutik Plurinational Unity Movement – New Country. 

In November 2021 she was one of the 81 politicians who abstained which allowed the Economic Development and Fiscal Sustainability Law to be passed. Other abstainers included Jessica Castillo, Sofía Espín, Gissella Molina, Sofía Sánchez and Ana Herrera.

On 1 April 2022 she was thrown out of the Pachakutik Plurinational Unity Movement – New Country party for contempt, not attending meetings, having agendas and not supporting the party's policies. The others excluded were Mario Ruíz, Mireya Pazmino, Fernando Cabascango, Darwin Pereira and Peter Calo.

References

1958 births
Living people
21st-century Ecuadorian women politicians
21st-century Ecuadorian politicians
Members of the National Assembly (Ecuador)
Women members of the National Assembly (Ecuador)